Simon Alexander Leslie Rose (born 6 January 1989) is an English cricketer. Rose is a right-handed batsman who bowls right-arm medium-fast. He was born in Huntingdon, Cambridgeshire.

While studying for his degree at Loughborough University, Rose made his first-class debut for Loughborough MCCU against Kent in 2010. He made a further appearance for the team in 2010, against Yorkshire. In his two first-class matches, he scored 14 runs, while with the ball he took a single wicket at an overall cost of 216 runs.

In 2011, he joined Wiltshire, making his debut for the county against Oxfordshire in the Minor Counties Championship. He made two further appearances in that competition in 2011.

References

External links
Simon Rose at ESPNcricinfo
Simon Rose at CricketArchive

1989 births
Living people
People from Huntingdon
Alumni of Loughborough University
English cricketers
Loughborough MCCU cricketers
Wiltshire cricketers